Chittenango Falls State Park is a  state park located in Madison County, New York, east of Cazenovia Lake. The park features a  waterfall that cascades over roughly 400-million-year-old bedrock. At the bottom of the falls Chittenango Creek flows underneath a wooden bridge. The park offers a variety of activities including picnic tables with pavilions, a playground, a nature trail, hiking, and fishing.

Approximately 45,000 visitors come to the park each year to engage in a variety of outdoor recreational activities. Although many camping guides still mistakenly list it as a campground, the park's campground was closed in the mid-2000s.

Chittenango Falls State Park is also home to the endemic and endangered Chittenango ovate amber snail (Novisuccinea chittenangoensis).

Trails and scenic viewing
While the park is open year-round, the trail leading to the falls' viewing bridge is closed during winter months due to icy conditions.  Views of the falls are still quite picturesque from the top however, with the ability to view the falls from the side of the creek or from a small viewing rail. On the opposite side of the creek, there is a steep uphill trail to the top of the falls opposite the entrance. Along that trail, there are several viewing spots.

Gallery

See also

 List of New York state parks

References

This article incorporates public domain text (a public domain work of the United States Government) from reference.

External links
 
 New York State Parks: Chittenango Falls State Park
 Chittenango Falls State Park trail map

State parks of New York (state)
Waterfalls of New York (state)
Parks in Madison County, New York
Landforms of Madison County, New York